Dihydropyrimidinase is an enzyme that in humans is encoded by the DPYS gene.

Dihydropyrimidinase catalyzes the conversion of 5,6-dihydrouracil to 3-ureidopropionate in pyrimidine metabolism.  Dihydropyrimidinase is expressed at a high level in liver and kidney as a major 2.5-kb transcript and a minor 3.8-kb transcript.  Defects in the DPYS gene are linked to dihydropyrimidinuria.

Interactive pathway map

References

Further reading